Bagh-e Pir (also Romanized as Bāgh-e Pīr) is a village in Garmdarreh Rural District, in the Central District of Karaj County, Alborz Province, Iran. At the 2006 census, its population was 208, in 57 families.

References 

Populated places in Karaj County